Yorkshire County Cricket Club started the 2008 season in the top division of the LV= County Championship and in the second division of the NatWest Pro40 league. The team also competed in the Friends Provident Trophy and the Twenty20 Cup.

Tables

Championship

Pro40

Friends Provident

Twenty20 Cup

* Yorkshire were penalised two points for fielding an ineligible player against Nottinghamshire, thus Glamorgan Dragons qualified as the second-best third-placed team.

Statistics
This section uses commonly accepted terms to describe cricket statistics.

First-class batting statistics

First-class bowling statistics

One-day batting statistics

One Day Bowling Statistics

Twenty20 batting statistics

Twenty20 bowling statistics

Fixtures

Pre-season

Yorkshire began their preparation for the 2008 season in the United Arab Emirates, playing four games in the Pro Arch Trophy. They won the tournament, finishing ahead of Lancashire, Somerset, Essex, Sussex and the United Arab Emirates.

Lancashire v Yorkshire

Somerset v Yorkshire

Sussex v Yorkshire

United Arab Emirates v Yorkshire

Yorkshire v Leeds/Bradford UCCE

County championship scorecards

Yorkshire v Hampshire

Yorkshire v Nottinghamshire

Durham v Yorkshire

Surrey v Yorkshire

 Points: Surrey 11, Yorkshire 11

Yorkshire v Lancashire

 Points: Yorkshire 9, Lancashire 12

Somerset v Yorkshire

 Points: Yorkshire 21, Somerset 5

Yorkshire v Durham

 Points: Durham 20, Yorkshire 3

Kent v Yorkshire

 Points: Kent 22, Yorkshire 8

Nottinghamshire v Yorkshire

 Points: Nottinghamshire 18, Yorkshire 3

Yorkshire v Surrey

 Points: Yorkshire 12, Surrey 8

Hampshire v Yorkshire

 Points: Hampshire 18, Yorkshire 4

Lancashire v Yorkshire

 Points: Lancashire 6, Yorkshire 12

Yorkshire v Kent

 Points: Yorkshire 12, Kent 7

Yorkshire v Sussex

 Points: Yorkshire 7, Sussex 8

Yorkshire v Somerset

 Points: Yorkshire 12, Somerset 11

Sussex v Yorkshire

 Points: Yorkshire 12, Sussex 8

Friends Provident scorecards

Durham v Yorkshire

Yorkshire v Derbyshire (24 over match)

Yorkshire v Durham

Lancashire v Yorkshire

Scotland v Yorkshire

 Points: Yorkshire 2, Scotland 0

Derbyshire v Yorkshire

 Points: Derbyshire 1, Yorkshire 1

Yorkshire v Scotland

 Points: Yorkshire 2, Scotland 0

Yorkshire v Lancashire

 Points: Yorkshire 1, Lancashire 1

Gloucestershire v Yorkshire

 Yorkshire progress to the semi-finals.

Essex v Yorkshire

 Essex progress to the final.

Twenty20 Cup

Yorkshire v Derbyshire

 Points: Derbyshire 2, Yorkshire 0

Yorkshire v Nottinghamshire (15 over match)

 Points: Nottinghamshire 2, Yorkshire 0

Derbyshire v Yorkshire

 Points: Yorkshire 2, Nottinghamshire 0

Leicestershire v Yorkshire

 Points: Yorkshire 2, Leicestershire 0

Yorkshire v Lancashire

 Points: Yorkshire 2, Lancashire 0

Lancashire v Yorkshire

 Points: Yorkshire 2, Lancashire 0

Yorkshire v Durham

 Points: Yorkshire 1, Durham 1

Durham v Yorkshire

 Points: Durham 2, Yorkshire 0

Yorkshire v Leicestershire

 Points: Yorkshire 1, Leicestershire 1

Nottinghamshire v Yorkshire

 Points: Yorkshire 2, Nottinghamshire 0. Yorkshire were deemed to have fielded an ineligible player, thus were penalised two match points.

Durham v Yorkshire

 Yorkshire failed to qualify to the knock-out stages as they were penalised with a two match-point penalty after fielding an ineligible player against Nottinghamshire.

NatWest Pro40

Essex v Yorkshire

 Points: Essex 2, Yorkshire 0

Surrey v Yorkshire

 Points: Yorkshire 2, Surrey 0

Yorkshire v Leicestershire

 Points: Yorkshire 2, Leicestershire 0

Derbyshire v Yorkshire (34 over match)

 Points: Derbyshire 1, Yorkshire 1

Yorkshire v Kent

 Points: Yorkshire 2, Kent 0

Yorkshire v Glamorgan

 Points: Yorkshire 2, Glamorgan 0

Yorkshire v Warwickshire

 Points: Yorkshire 1, Warwickshire 1

Northamptonshire v Yorkshire

 Points: Yorkshire 2, Northamptonshire 0

References

Sources
BBC Sport
Yorkshire CC's website

2008 in English cricket
2008